Dejan Koraksić (born 25 December 1997) is a Serbian professional footballer who plays as a left-back for Canadian Soccer League club Serbian White Eagles FC.

Club career

Early years
Born in Čačak, Koraksić started his career with local club BIP. Later he moved to Sloboda Čačak where he made his debut as a senior, making 6 appearances during the 2013–14 Serbian League West season. Koraksić also spent some period playing with the youth academy of Bambi Kraljevo before joining Novi Pazar where he appeared as a left-back for the club's youth team in the 2014–15 season.

Metalac Gornji Milanovac
In the summer of 2015, Koraksić officially joined Metalac Gornji Milanovac. The whole first season playing with the new club, he spent with the youth team, but was also licensed with the first team. After he overgrown the youth categories in 2016, Koraksić spent the summer pre-season with the first team and later started the 2016–17 Serbian SuperLiga season as a full senior player. He made his professional debut for Metalac in a league game against Rad, played on 5 November 2016.

In January 2020, he was loaned out to Novi Pazar for the remainder of the season.

Radnik Bijeljina
On 20 July 2020, Bosnian Premier League club Radnik Bijeljina announced the signing of Koraksić. He made his official debut for Radnik in a league game against Sloboda Tuzla on 1 August 2020. Only five months later, in December 2020, Koraksić left the club.

Blansko 
Following his departure from Bosnia, he secured a deal in the Czech Republic's National Football League with FK Blansko for the remainder of the season. He made his debut for the club on March 13, 2021, against SK Líšeň. In total, he would appear in 7 matches for Blansko.

Serbia  
After the conclusion of his tenure in the Czech Republic, he returned to Serbia to play in the country's third-tier league with Borac Cacak where he served as the team captain. For the 2022 season, he signed with league rivals FK Smederevo 1924.

Canada 
In the summer of 2022, he played abroad in the Canadian Soccer League with the Serbian White Eagles. He helped the Serbs in securing the regular-season title including a playoff berth.

Career statistics

Club

References

External links
 

1997 births
Living people
Sportspeople from Čačak
Serbian footballers
Serbian expatriate footballers
Expatriate footballers in Bosnia and Herzegovina
Serbian SuperLiga players
Serbian First League players
Premier League of Bosnia and Herzegovina players
FK Novi Pazar players
FK Metalac Gornji Milanovac players
FK Radnik Bijeljina players 
FK Blansko players 
FK Borac Čačak players 
FK Smederevo players
Serbian White Eagles FC players
Canadian Soccer League (1998–present) players
Association football fullbacks
Czech National Football League players
Serbian League players